The Southeastern Pennsylvania Transportation Authority (SEPTA) contains several trolley lines and interurban lines. SEPTA's City Transit Division operates five Subway–Surface Trolley Lines, and one Heritage trolley (Route 15), all of which were inherited from the former Philadelphia Transportation Company and originally built by the Philadelphia Rapid Transit Company. The Suburban Transit Division operates the Media-Sharon Hill Lines (Routes 101 and 102), which were built by P&WC and later inherited by PSTC. Operation of these two lines were taken over by SEPTA in 1970.

Subway–Surface Trolley Line stations

Nearly all stations are located in the City of Philadelphia, except for small sections of Routes 11 and 13 in the boroughs of Darby and Yeadon.

Media–Sharon Hill Line stations

All stations are located in Delaware County, Pennsylvania and were inherited from the Philadelphia Suburban Transportation Company (PSTC).

References

 
 
 
SEPTA Light Rail